Embrace of the Vampire is a 1995 American erotic thriller-vampire film directed by Anne Goursaud. It stars Alyssa Milano as Charlotte, a chaste girl who is haunted by a vampire played by Martin Kemp.

Plot
Charlotte is a "chaste" good girl, who is having erotic dreams where she meets her dream lover who is a dark, handsome vampire – who was himself bitten by nymph vampires long ago, losing the love of his life, and who sees Charlotte as the reincarnation of his long lost lover, a princess. Charlotte's dreams interfere with her relationship with her real-life boyfriend, who is not quite as fascinating as the vampire dream boy. The vampire gives Charlotte an Ankh that alters her behaviour when she wears it. Charlotte is drawn towards the vampire's world but she is disturbed by her longings. There is the usual struggle between such opposing entities, as Charlotte sees that not only does she have to choose between her boyfriend and her mysterious night-time visitor, but also between light and dark, and good and evil.

Charlotte is being influenced by the vampire and starts behaving wantonly, going to a sexy party wearing nothing but ankle boots and a short, low-cut dress from her friend Nicole's wardrobe. She has her drink spiked and after briefly kissing a student called Milo, they are interrupted by his sassy girlfriend Eliza, the campus slut, who is killed by the vampire banging her head against the Charlotte's door, then licking the blood from the door as Charlotte listens in a state of arousal from the other side of the door. Charlotte drifts in and out of her dream as the vampire tells her to come to him, as he believes there is nothing left for her here (on earth) and he only has hours to exist unless he can get Charlotte to love him. After some dream scenes, Charlotte is in the tower with the vampire. Chris (her boyfriend) is there, but the vampire pushes Chris away, and is about to put the bite on her when she utters Chris's name; he initially tells her not to think of Chris and instead think of himself and her as a couple. Then, after Charlotte calls out Chris's name again, the vampire angrily warns her that she cannot take Chris's love to the eternal life he was offering her, and disappears. Charlotte and Chris wake up in the morning and kiss, and the vampire perishes while lying in his room.

Cast
 Alyssa Milano as Charlotte Wells
 Martin Kemp as The Vampire
 Harrison Pruett as Chris
 Jordan Ladd as Eliza
 Rachel True as Nicole
 Charlotte Lewis as Sarah
 Jennifer Tilly as Marika
 Rebecca Ferratti as Princess
 John Riedlinger as Milo

Production
In an interview published in 2005 Anne Goursaud, director of Embrace of the Vampire, said the film "was made for $500,000 in thirteen days". She estimates that thanks to video sales "it has made maybe $15 million".

References

External links
 
 

1995 films
1995 horror films
1995 independent films
American erotic horror films
American supernatural horror films
American independent films
1990s English-language films
Films about reincarnation
Films shot in Minnesota
LGBT-related horror films
American vampire films
Films about nightmares
New Line Cinema films
1995 directorial debut films
1995 LGBT-related films
Films directed by Anne Goursaud
1990s American films